Du Poète Lake is a freshwater lake that has become the "Du Poète Reservoir", located west of the Gouin Reservoir, in the territory of the city of La Tuque, in the administrative region of Mauricie, in the province of Quebec, in Canada. This lake extends entirely in the canton of Poisson.

This lake, which is part of the natural course of the Mégiscane River and collects the waters of the Suzie River by artificial deviation. It is famous thanks to the Mégiscane Dam, built to its natural mouth. This dam was erected in 1954 to divert current from Suzie River and from the upper part of the Mégiscane River to an eastbound diversion channel to the Gouin Reservoir, thereby further feeding downstream the hydroelectric power stations on the Saint-Maurice River.

Hydropower is the main economic activity of the sector. Forestry and recreational tourism activities, second.

The "Du Poète Lake" hydrographic slope is served on the North side by a forest road (East-West direction) serving the Mégiscane Dam, as well as by the forest road R1009 (North-South direction) serving the West of the Gouin Reservoir.

The "Du Poète Lake" surface is usually frozen from mid-November to the end of April, but safe ice circulation is generally from early December to late March. This body of water is of the nivo-rainwater type; the water level varies depending on the auxiliary weir east of "Du Poète Lake" and the weir of the Mégiscane Dam.

Geography

Toponymy
The French toponym "lac du Poète" was formalized on 5 décembre 1968 by the Commission de toponymie du Québec, eg at its creation.

Notes and references

See also 

Lakes of Mauricie
La Tuque, Quebec